Page of Coins (or Jack/Knave of Coins/Pentacles) is a card used in Latin suited playing cards which include tarot decks. It is part of what tarot card readers call the "Minor Arcana".

Tarot cards are used throughout much of Europe to play tarot card games.

In English-speaking countries, where the games are largely unknown, Tarot cards came to be utilized primarily for divinatory purposes.

Divination usage
Often used to represent a young person. Can mean a changing of your line of work and/or taking on more responsibility.  But primarily, this is the card for students.

References

Suit of Coins